This is a list of places in the Australian state of Tasmania by population.

Urban centres are defined by the Australian Bureau of Statistics as being a population cluster of 1,000 or more people.

See also
 Demographics of Australia
 List of cities in Australia
 List of places in New South Wales by population
 List of places in the Northern Territory by population
 List of cities in Queensland by population
 List of places in South Australia by population
 List of places in Victoria by population
 List of places in Western Australia by population

Notes and references

Tasmania
Tasmania by population
Cities by population